The 2018 U.S. Cellular 250 presented by The Rasmussen Group was the 19th stock car race of the 2018 NASCAR Xfinity Series season, and the 10th iteration of the event. The race was held on Saturday, July 28, 2018, in Newton, Iowa at Iowa Speedway, a 7⁄8 mile (1.4 km) permanent D-shaped oval racetrack. The race was extended from its scheduled 250 laps to 257 due to a NASCAR overtime finish. At race's end, Christopher Bell of Joe Gibbs Racing would battle and hold off JR Motorsports driver Justin Allgaier in an overtime restart to win his fifth career NASCAR Xfinity Series win, his fourth of the season, and his third consecutive win in the series, a feat that was last accomplished by Dale Earnhardt Jr. in 2018. To fill out the podium, Kyle Benjamin of Joe Gibbs Racing would finish third.

Background 

Iowa Speedway is a 7/8-mile (1.4 km) paved oval motor racing track in Newton, Iowa, United States, approximately 30 miles (48 km) east of Des Moines. The track was designed with influence from Rusty Wallace and patterned after Richmond Raceway, a short track where Wallace was very successful. It has over 25,000 permanent seats as well as a unique multi-tiered Recreational Vehicle viewing area along the backstretch.

Entry list

Practice

First practice 
The first practice session was held on Friday, July 27, at 4:05 PM CST, and would last for 50 minutes.

Second and final practice 
The second and final practice session, sometimes referred to as Happy Hour, was held on Friday, July 27, at 6:05 PM CST, and would last for 50 minutes.

Qualifying 
Qualifying was held on Saturday, July 28, at 4:20 PM CST. Since Iowa Speedway is under 2 miles (3.2 km), the qualifying system was a multi-car system that included three rounds. The first round was 15 minutes, where every driver would be able to set a lap within the 15 minutes. Then, the second round would consist of the fastest 24 cars in Round 1, and drivers would have 10 minutes to set a lap. Round 3 consisted of the fastest 12 drivers from Round 2, and the drivers would have 5 minutes to set a time. Whoever was fastest in Round 3 would win the pole.

No drivers would fail to qualify.

Full qualifying results

Race results 
Stage 1 Laps: 60

Stage 2 Laps: 60

Stage 3 Laps: 137

References 

2018 NASCAR Xfinity Series
NASCAR races at Iowa Speedway
July 2018 sports events in the United States
2018 in sports in Iowa